The Rio Grande silvery minnow or Rio Grande minnow (Hybognathus amarus) is a small herbivorous North American fish. It is one of the seven North American members of the genus Hybognathus, in the cyprinid family.

The Rio Grande silvery minnow is one of the most endangered fish in North America, according to the U. S. Fish and Wildlife Service (USFWS). They were classified as endangered in the U.S. in 1994, and now are found in less than 5 percent of their natural habitat in the Rio Grande. Historically, the minnow was found from Española, New Mexico, to the Gulf of Mexico in Texas. Now it can only be seen between Cochiti Dam and Elephant Butte Reservoir.

Description
It is a stout silvery minnow with moderately small eyes and a small mouth. Adults may reach 3.5 inches in total length.

Diet and behavior
Rio Grande silvery minnows are herbivores whose diet is believed to consist of river plants and benthic macroinvertabrates, though there is little research into their diet due to the difficulty of getting into their stomachs. They play a role in keeping water clean by eating bad algae.

Silvery minnows tend to skim the bottom of rivers and stream, and are prolific spawners. They serve as food source for other animals.

Reproduction
The Rio Grande Silvery Minnow's eggs hatch in about 24 hours into larvae that can swim in just 3 to 4 days. It is no surprise that a species so programmed for survival once dominated a biological niche that spanned 3,000 meandering miles (4,825 kilometers) from New Mexico to Texas.

Classification under the Endangered Species Act
The Rio Grande silvery minnow was first listed on July 20, 1994. It is currently designated as Endangered in the Entire Range.
The population decline of the Rio Grande Silvery Minnow has been almost directly proportional to recent alterations to the Rio Grande over the past century. There have been multiple diversions for municipal and agricultural use; alteration of the natural hydrograph (no spring runoff to cue spawning); habitat degradation from river narrowing and canalization; and construction of diversion dams which prevent migration. Even with the Rio Grande Silvery Minnow’s listing in 1994, its population has continued to drop at a great rate. The minnow now numbers way below its 1994 population, and is found in only 5 percent of its former habitat.

Alterations of the Rio Grande include not only the modification of the flow of water by dams and channels but also the unintentional polluting of the quality of the water. This pollution can be originated from many factors, the major ones being, effluents by the military and industrial companies as well as wastewater from cities and nearby towns.

Restoration efforts
In 2000, the U.S. Fish and Wildlife Service initiated a silvery minnow egg salvage pilot project. Biologists from the Service, Bureau of Reclamation, and University of New Mexico collect minnow eggs as well as reproductively-ready adult minnows near Elephant Butte, where these efforts do not disturb upstream populations. Captured adult minnows are induced to spawn, either at the Albuquerque Biological Park or the Service's New Mexico Fishery Resources Office. Biologists then either return the resulting fish to the Rio Grande or hold them for captive propagation.

The silvery minnow refugium 
as taken from the Van H. Gilbert Architect PC official page: 
Van H. Gilbert Architect PC, in association with FishPro, developed conceptual and final design for a naturalized refugium for propagation of the endangered Rio Grande silvery minnow at the City of Albuquerque's Biological Park.
The facility consists of a 50,000 gallon outdoor refugium as well as a 3,500 SF building with tiers of aquarium tanks that contain tens of thousands of baby minnows, each no more than a sixth of an inch long.
The donut-shaped outdoor pond varies in depth from about one inch to two feet. Pumps control the current to mimic the natural flows of the Rio Grande. The bottom surface is a mixture of sand, gravel and silt.
The breeding goal of the $1.7 million facility was to produce 50,000 minnows this year - with 25,000 minnows to be returned to the river and 25,000 to be retained for future captive spawning. The actual numbers are much higher.
This project is the recipient of the Association of Conservation Engineers 2003 Award of Excellence (top honor/national design award) and the Best Civil/Infrastructure New Mexico Project for the Best of 2003 Awards from Southwest Contractor magazine.

Legal action 
Defenders of Wildlife, Forest Guardians and others filed suit in 1999 against BREC and ACOE for their lack of compliance under the ESA in their management of the river.
In 2002, Judge Parker affirmed a June 2001 biological opinion from FWS on how to avoid and mitigate impacts to the silvery minnow, but also concluded that BREC has the ability to use Rio Grande waters for the survival of the silvery minnow.
In 2003, the Tenth Circuit upheld BREC's ability to deliver water to the river for endangered species.
After a series of rulings and appeals, in 2010 the environmental groups' complaint was dismissed in Rio Grande Silvery Minnow v. Bureau of Reclamation, although a number of agreements had been made by then to try to improve the silvery minnow's remaining habitat.

References

External links
Rio Grande Water Quality Studies/Silvery Minnow  US Fish & Wildlife Service

Hybognathus
Endemic fauna of the United States
Fauna of the Rio Grande valleys
Freshwater fish of the United States
Endangered fauna of the United States
ESA endangered species
Fish described in 1856
Taxa named by Charles Frédéric Girard